Duchy of Podolia was a historical state that previously was a part of Kingdom of Galicia–Volhynia. The principality of Southwest Galicia–Volhynia, which was formed as a result of the struggle for the legacy of the Kingdom of Galicia–Volhynia. Founded by Knyaz George Koriatovich from the Karijotas house.

Following the 14th century partition of the Kingdom between the Kingdom of Poland and the Grand Duchy of Lithuania during the Galicia–Volhynia Wars, in 1366 Yuriy Koriatovich of Gediminids along with his brother succeeded in unknown way over the duchy as vassal of the Polish crown. In 1377 the duchy became a fiefdom after the King of Hungary Louis I of Hungary conducted a military raid on Ruthenian lands. After the death of King Louis, the Koriatovich brothers took active participation in electing Jogaila as King of Poland, yet kept their fief loyalty to the King of Hungary.

After a conquest of Podolie by Grand Duke of Vytautas in 1394, the Duchy of Podolia was granted on ducal rights (ius ducalis) to the Voivode of Krakow Spytko II of Melsztyn. Following the death of the last at the battle of Vorskla in 1399, King of Poland Jogaila granted the land to his brother Knyaz Svitrigaila. In 1401 Svitrigaila ran away to the Teutonic Order. In 1403 Koriatovich brother completely surrendered any claims for the duchy.

In 1434, the duchy was transformed into the Podolian Voivodeship of the Crown of the Kingdom of Poland.

Territory 
Podolia (outdated  —  the lower reaches) was divided into Western  —  Dniester and East  —  Father. Podilsky land (mostly lands inhabited by schools) belonged to the Galician principality and the Grand Duchy of Kyiv. The rulers belonged to the dynasty of Rurikovich. During the invasion of the Golden Horde in 1238, the main part of Podolia was tapped. In 1257,  A campaign of the troops of the Kingdom of Galicia–Volhynia in Boheshkov land, which was an attempt to restore control over Podolia.

The territory of the principality covered the land from intermittent of Strypa and Zolota in the west to the Dnieper in the east, in the south — east, the natural line was the Dniester River. In the south, the border was the limit of the steppe zone, controlled by the Golden Horde. In the north, leashed with Volyn and Kyiv lands.

According to Oleksander Guagnini, Podilsky Region is very wide: from the West goes from the Muntenia and Volos border and extends to the Don River. Here was the Podilsky Ulus of the Golden Horde. And P. Knyazss occupied its own land of small Podolia.

History 
The last Galicia–Volhynia monarch was Yuri II Boleslav  —  the son of the daughter of Yuri I of Galicia Mary and Mazovian Knyaz Troiden I. He settled relations with the Golden Horde. In 1337, he made joint with the Ordin troops campaign to Poland, trying to return captured by Poles in 1303 to Lublin lands. Supporting peace with Lithuania and the Teutonic Order, Yuri II was in a bad relationship with Poland and Hungary who prepared a joint attack on the Kingdom of Galicia–Volhynia. After his poisoning in 1340, the struggle for the Earth of the Galician — Vladimir state was dispersed between the Grand Duke Volynsky, Liubartas and the Polish King Casimir III the Great. 1349 King Casimir III captured Galician land. In April 1350, the Louis I of Hungary concluded with Kazimir III, by which Hungary "retreated its hereditary rights" to the Galicia–Volhynia Kingdom is lifelong with Casimir III.

Karijotas 
Karijotas began to master the Podolia after the division of the Galicia–Volhynia Kingdom. In 1362, Four Brothers of Koriyovichiv: Oleksander, Yuriy, Konstantin and Fedor participated in the troops of Stryka (Uncle Father)  —  Grand Duke Algirdas  —  in the Battle of Blue Waters. For this 1363, according to his brothers, their possessions on Podillia and the Podilsky principality were formed. Brothers were the co — rulers of this principality: Yuri kept Kamyanets, and Konstantin  —  Smotrych. Fedor at this time was in Hungary. In 1371, Olexander Koriyovich returned to Podolia. The first rulers were Knyazs Yuriy and Oleksander Karijotas, who until 1366 performed on the side of Gediminids. Also known are the other brothers of Coria: Boris, Vasil (Semen Yuriyovich, as the probable son of Yuriy Koryatovych, appears once among the witnesses of the document issued by representatives of the older generation). In documents they protrude either a couple or alone. In general, this way of government is not something extraordinary for that time.

In 1366, the Podilsky principality fell into vassal dependence on the Polish kingdom, the rulers of Oleksander Koriatovich I Yuri paid tribute to the King of Kazimir III. Since then, the ruler of the Podilsky principality is a couple — the eldest and next by the Knyaz (Dumvirat).

In 1372, Knyaz Yuriy invited to take the throne in the neighboring Principality of Moldavia, he was up to 1377, when he was poisoned in contemporary local boyars (buried in the monastery near the city of Birlad). In 1374, he suffered the capital of Podillya from Smotrych to Kamyanets and built a city — fortress city with a castle and city fortifications. At the same time Kamyanets received from the Knyazs of Yuriy and Oleksandr Magdeburg rights. His successor became Brother Oleksander, who had previously owned Volodymyr and Krimets.

After death in the 1370th Casimir III, his sister son Louis I of Hungary became King of Galicia–Volhynia after Congress of Visegrád (1339). In 1372, he handed power over Galicia to his governor — Silesian Knyaz Vladislaus II of Opole (1372 — 1379, 1385 — 1387).

1377 — Knyaz Oleksander and Boris, as a result of the military campaign of the Hungarian King Louis on the Galicia–Volhynia lands, recognized the volatile dependence on him, evidence of which is found a coin of Podilsky half — money depicted with a picture on the reverse of the Anjou coat of arms, a coin in Smotrych, the first capital of the Podilsky principality. The "duets" of the senior coriatiches were several: Yuri and Oleksander, Oleksander and Boris, Boris and Constantine, Constantine and Fedor, Fedor and Vasyl. With this tradition, the fact that coins that have recently attributed to the Coriatovy are not recently attributed to coriaticals, only one of them — Konstantin. Such coins have only a few. On the one hand, it is depicted, on the one hand, Yuri Sorry, from the second — coat of arms Charl I Robert — on the left of white and red stripes of arpades, the right — yellow lilies on the blue shield of the Anjuly Sycolian dynasty; The two — way inscription is read by specialists as "Knyaz Konstantin coin, a smotful mastery. The coins were patterned according to "Galicia–Volhynia money", which were malled in Lviv, and had the name of "Podilsky half — seals".

Another known coin is P.K. — Podilsky Denarium of Knyaz Fedor Koriatovich, ruled in 1388 — 1393. The coin has a size of 12x13.5 mm, mass 0.30 g, 0.600 silver sample.

With the death of Louis Hungarian his elder daughter Maria became the titular queen of Hungary (1382 — 1395), Galicia and Vladimiria (1382 — 1387). The younger daughter of Yadviga received Poland, where the rules in 1384 — 1399. After the death of King Louis and Hungarian (1382) Knyazs Boris and Konstantin — Jr. took effective participation in the election of Jagayl to the Royal Prestol and his marriage with the 12 — year — old Queen Jadwiga of Poland.

About 1389 Fedir Koriyatovich inherited Podillya by the death of older brothers. In 1392, he entered the Union with Svidrigail  —  at that time Knyaz Vitebsk, which was also opposed to the policy of Yagaila, aimed at full subordination of the Undyl Principities up to their elimination.

References

Sources 
 Witalij Mychajłowśkyj: Подільське князівство. W Encykłopedija istoriji Ukrajiny : у 10 т. / редкол.: В. А. Смолій (голова) та ін. ; Інститут історії України НАН України. T. 8 : Па  —  Прик. Kijów: Wyd. Наук. думка, 2011, s. 305 — 306. .

States and territories established in 1363
Geographic history of Ukraine
Former subdivisions of Lithuania
Fiefdoms of Poland